Sclerocris is a genus of moths of the family Oecophoridae.

Species
Sclerocris acropenthes  (Turner, 1938)
Sclerocris albipalpis  (Turner, 1939)
Sclerocris amoebaea  (Meyrick, 1889)
Sclerocris amphisema  (Lower, 1907)
Sclerocris chalcoxantha  (Meyrick, 1889)
Sclerocris chiastis  (Meyrick, 1889)
Sclerocris comoxantha  (Meyrick, 1889)
Sclerocris cremnodes  (Meyrick, 1883)
Sclerocris crocinastis  (Meyrick, 1889)
Sclerocris cyclodesma  (Turner, 1938)
Sclerocris echidnias  (Meyrick, 1889)
Sclerocris goniosticha  (Turner, 1939)
Sclerocris gymnastica  (Meyrick, 1920)
Sclerocris menodes  (Meyrick, 1888)
Sclerocris nephelopa  (Meyrick, 1883)
Sclerocris nomistis  (Meyrick, 1889)
Sclerocris ochrosarca  (Turner, 1938)
Sclerocris pithanodes  (Meyrick, 1920)
Sclerocris styphlodes  (Turner, 1946)
Sclerocris tetragona  (Meyrick, 1889)
Sclerocris tetrasticha  (Turner, 1944)
Sclerocris thetica  (Turner, 1916)
Sclerocris thiodes  (Turner, 1917)

References

Markku Savela's ftp.funet.fi

 
Oecophorinae
Moth genera